The United States Air Force maintains a number of Field Museums and Heritage Centers.

Current museums
 National Museum of the United States Air Force – Wright-Patterson Air Force Base, Dayton, Ohio
 Air Force Armament Museum – Eglin AFB, near Valparaiso, Florida
 Air Force Flight Test Center Museum – Edwards AFB, near North Edwards and Rosamond, California
 Air Force Space and Missile Museum – Cape Canaveral Space Force Station, north of Patrick Space Force Base and Cocoa Beach, Florida
 Air Mobility Command Museum – Dover AFB, near Dover, Delaware
 Barksdale Global Power Museum – Barksdale AFB, near Bossier City, Louisiana
 Enlisted Heritage Research Institute – Maxwell AFB, Alabama
 Hill Aerospace Museum – northwest of Hill AFB, near Ogden, Utah
 Malmstrom Museum – Malmstrom AFB, Montana
 McChord Air Museum – McChord AFB, near Tacoma, Washington
 Museum of Aviation – near Robins AFB, Warner Robins, Georgia
 Peterson Air and Space Museum – Peterson AFB, Colorado Springs, Colorado
 Sheppard AFB Heritage Center – Sheppard AFB, Texas
 South Dakota Air and Space Museum – Box Elder, South Dakota (outside the main gate of Ellsworth AFB)
 Thunderbirds Museum – Nellis AFB, near Las Vegas, Nevada
 Travis Air Force Base Aviation Museum – Travis AFB, near Fairfield, California
 USAF Airman Heritage Museum – Lackland AFB, Texas
 Warren ICBM and Heritage Museum – F.E. Warren AFB, near Cheyenne, Wyoming

Closed museums
 Air Force Rescue Memorial Museum – Kirtland Air Force Base, Albuquerque, New Mexico (closed January 1990)
 Beale Air Force Base Museum – Beale Air Force Base, east of Marysville, California (closed in February 1995)
 Davis-Monthan Air Force Base Museum – Davis-Monthan Air Force Base, Tucson, Arizona (closed 1949)
 Fairchild Heritage Museum – Fairchild Air Force Base, Spokane, Washington (closed 2002)
 Lowry Heritage Museum – Lowry Air Force Base, Denver, Colorado
 Edward H. White II Museum of Aerospace Medicine – Brooks City-Base, San Antonio, Texas (closed in 2011)
 Plattsburgh Air Force Base Museum – Plattsburgh Air Force Base, Plattsburgh, New York (closed in 1995)
 Randolph Air Force Base Museum – Randolph Air Force Base, Universal City, Texas (closed in 1958)
 Silver Wings Aviation Museum – Mather Air Force Base, near Sacramento, California
 USAF Security Forces Museum – Lackland AFB, next to San Antonio, Texas (closed in August 2014)

Former museums
These museums were once part of the Air Force museum system, but have since become private:
 Aerospace Museum of California
 Castle Air Museum
 Grissom Air Museum
 March Field Air Museum
 Minnesota Air National Guard Museum
 Selfridge Military Air Museum
 Strategic Air Command & Aerospace Museum

See also
 National Museum of the Mighty Eighth Air Force
 Octave Chanute Aerospace Museum
 Pima Air & Space Museum

References

Footnotes

Notes

External links
 Air Force Museums and their Civilian Counterparts: Improving Both Sides of the Challenge Coin
 Department of the Air Force Heritage Program
 Museums and Money
 The History of the Air Force History and Museums Program

Museums

Air Force